The Primera División de Futsal (formerly, División de Honor), is the main futsal league in Argentina. Organised by the Argentine Football Association (AFA), the first championship was held in 1986.

The Argentine futsal league system is made up of four divisions (Primera A to Primera D), with a total of 87 clubs competing in all of them, which also take part of Copa Argentina de Futsal.

This league is the main division of futsal in Argentina, contested by clubs from the provinces of Buenos Aires and Santa Fe. The Argentine league is regarded as one of the main futsal leagues in South America.

Clubs 
There are 16 clubs competing in the 2019 season, they are:

Champions

Titles by club
The list include all the titles won by each club since the first futsal championship held in 1986

Notable players 
Many notable Argentine football players started playing futsal when they were children. Some of them are Fernando Redondo, Juan Pablo Sorín, Andrés D'Alessandro, Esteban Cambiasso and Juan Román Riquelme (in Club Parque), Marcelo Gallardo in Estrella de Maldonado and Leandro Romagnoli in Franja de Oro.

Notes

References

External links 
 Futsal website on AFA

1986 establishments in Argentina
Futsal
Futsal competitions in Argentina
Sports leagues established in 1986
Argentina